The 643rd Transportation Detachment also known as 643rd Auto Cargo Documentation Detachment is a subordinate unit of the 1395th Transportation Battalion, 1394th Transportation Brigade that inherited the lineage of the Deployment Support Command.

History
Constituted 10 January 1967 in the Regular Army as the 643d Transportation Detachment.
Activated 1 March 1967 at Fort Story, Virginia
Inactivated 18 March 1968 at Fort Story, Virginia
Activated 1 January 1969 at Fort Sill, Oklahoma
Inactivated 30 September 1971 at Fort Sill, Oklahoma
Withdrawn 5 March 1998 from the Regular Army and allotted to the Army Reserve
Activated 16 September 2001 at Spokane, Washington
Ordered into active military service 15 October 2009 at Spokane, Washington; released from active military service 18 November 2010 and reverted to reserve status with location at Fairchild Air Force Base, Washington

Deployments
2009 - Kuwait

References

Military units and formations of the United States Army